The Golden Stag Festival is the most popular Romanian song contest and awards, held annually in the town of Braşov, Romania.

History
The Golden Stag was first held in 1968, but after 1971 it was banned by the Communist leadership. After the fall of Communism, new editions were organised starting from 1992. Between 2010 and 2017 the festival wasn't held due to lack of funds. It returned in 2018.    

The Golden Stag Festival takes place during the summer and is broadcast live by Romanian TV station TVR1.

Competition

References

External links  
Official website  

 
Music festivals in Romania
Tourist attractions in Brașov
Piața Sfatului